The following is a list of stadiums in Oceania.

List

American Samoa
Veterans Memorial Stadium – Pago Pago

Australia

Cricket and Australian rules football
AAMI Stadium – Adelaide (formerly Football Park)
Adelaide Oval – Adelaide
Arden St Oval – Melbourne
Aurora Stadium – Launceston
Bellerive Oval – Hobart
Brisbane Cricket Ground – Brisbane (Commonly known as "the Gabba")
Drummoyne Oval – Sydney
Etihad Stadium – Melbourne (formerly Colonial Stadium, Telstra Dome and Docklands Stadium)
Kooyong Stadium – Melbourne
Lilac Hill – Perth
Ikon Park – Melbourne
Magdalla Park – Sydney
Manuka Oval – Canberra
Marrara Oval – Darwin
Melbourne Cricket Ground – Melbourne
Metricon Stadium – Gold Coast
North Hobart Oval – Hobart
Patersons Stadium – Perth (originally "Subiaco Oval")
Richmond Cricket Ground – Melbourne
Skilled Stadium – Geelong (formerly Kardinia Park)
Sydney Cricket Ground – Sydney
Victoria Park – Melbourne
WACA Ground – Perth
Waverley Park – Melbourne
Windy Hill – Melbourne

Rugby league, rugby union and soccer
1300 Smiles Stadium – Townsville (Formerly known as Stockland Stadium & Dairy Farmers Stadium)
AAMI Park – Melbourne (known non-commercially as Melbourne Rectangular Stadium)
ANZ Stadium – Sydney (formerly Stadium Australia and Telstra Stadium)
Hunter Stadium – Newcastle (formerly Marathon Stadium, EnergyAustralia Stadium & Ausgrid Stadium)
Ballymore Stadium – Brisbane
Belmore Oval, Sydney – Sydney
Cbus Super Stadium – Gold Coast
Central Coast Stadium – Central Coast, New South Wales
Brookvale Oval – Sydney
Campbelltown Stadium – Sydney
GIO Stadium – Canberra (formerly Bruce Stadium and Canberra Stadium (while GIO has the naming rights))
EW Moore Oval – Griffith, NSW
Dolphin Oval – Brisbane
Henson Park, Sydney – Sydney
Hindmarsh Stadium – Adelaide
Leichhardt Oval – Sydney
nib Stadium – Perth
Olympic Park Stadium – Melbourne (Closed & Demolished)
Parramatta Stadium – Sydney
Pepper Stadium – Sydney
Perry Lakes Stadium – Perth
Pioneer Oval – Sydney
QSAC Stadium – Brisbane (formally QEII Stadium)
Redfern Oval – Sydney
Suncorp Stadium – Brisbane (formerly Lang Park)
Sydney Football Stadium – Sydney (formerly Aussie Stadium )
Remondis Stadium – Cronulla
WIN Jubilee Oval – Sydney (Formerly known as Kogarah Park)
WIN Stadium – Wollongong

Basketball, cycling, swimming and tennis
Acer Arena – Sydney
Brisbane Entertainment Centre – Brisbane
Brisbane Convention & Exhibition Centre – Brisbane
Derwent Entertainment Centre – Hobart
Dunc Gray Velodrome – Sydney
HBF Stadium – Perth
Hisense Arena – Melbourne
Kooyong Stadium – Melbourne
Margaret Court Arena – Melbourne
NSW Tennis Centre – Sydney
Perth Arena – Perth
Queensland Tennis Centre – Brisbane
Rod Laver Arena – Melbourne
Silverdome – Launceston
Sleeman Centre – Brisbane
Sydney Entertainment Centre – Sydney

Other 
Dealadrome – Melbourne

Cook Islands
National Stadium, Avarua

Federated States of Micronesia
Yap Sports Complex – Colonia

Fiji
National Stadium – Suva
ANZ National Stadium – Suva

French Polynesia
Stade Pater – Pirae

Guam
Paseo Stadium – Agana
Wettengel Rugby Field – Agana

Kiribati
Bairiki National Stadium – Bairiki

Marshall Islands
Sports Stadium – Majuro

Nauru
Linkbelt Oval – Aiwo
Meneng Stadium – Meneng District

New Caledonia
Stade Numa-Daly Magenta – Nouméa

New Zealand

Fraser Park – Timaru
AMI Stadium (formerly Jade Stadium and Lancaster Park) – Christchurch
FMG Stadium – Palmerston North
ASB Tennis Centre – Auckland
Basin Reserve – Wellington
Baypark Stadium – Mount Maunganui
Bert Sutcliffe Oval – Lincoln
Bluewater Stadium – Napier
Carisbrook – Dunedin
Caledonian Ground – Dunedin
Carlaw Park – Auckland
Horncastle Arena – Christchurch
Centennial Park – Christchurch
Centennial Park – Ngaruawahia
Centennial Park – Oamaru
Centre Park – Mangere
Cobham Oval – Whangarei
Colin Maiden Park – Auckland
Cooks Gardens – Wanganui
Cornwall Park Stadium – Auckland
Dunedin Ice Stadium – Dunedin
Forsyth Barr Stadium – Dunedin
Growers Stadium – Pukekohe
Eden Park – Auckland
Edgar Centre – Dunedin
Energy Events Centre – Rotorua
English Park – Christchurch
Hagley Oval – Christchurch
Fitzherbert Park – Palmerston North
Fred Taylor Park – West Auckland
Kiwitea Street – Auckland
Landsdowne Park – Blenheim
Mainpower Oval – Rangiora
McLean Park – Napier
Memorial Park Ground – Mosgiel
Moana Pool – Dunedin
Mount Smart Stadium (formerly Ericsson Stadium) – Auckland
Mystery Creek Events Centre – Hamilton
Nelson Park – Napier
Newtown Park – Wellington
North Harbour Stadium – Albany
North Shore Events Centre – Auckland
Owen Delany Park – Taupo
Pettigrew Green Arena – Taradale
Porirua Park – Porirua
Pukekura Park – New Plymouth
Queenstown Events Centre – Queenstown
Queen Elizabeth Youth Centre – Tauranga
Queen Elizabeth II Park – Christchurch
Rotorua International Stadium – Rotorua
Rugby League Park – Christchurch
Rugby Park – Christchurch
Rugby Park – Greymouth
Rugby Park Stadium – Invercargill
Spartan Park – Lower Hutt
Stadium Southland – Invercargill
Sunnyvale Park – Dunedin
Tahuna Park – Dunedin
Te Rauparaha Arena – Porirua
TelstraClear Pacific Events Centre – Auckland
Tepid Baths – Auckland
Toll Stadium – Whangarei
Trafalgar Centre – Nelson
Trafalgar Park – Nelson
Trusts Stadium – West Auckland
TSB Bank Arena – Wellington
TSB Stadium – New Plymouth
University Oval – Dunedin
Spark Arena – Auckland
Village Green – Christchurch
Waikato Stadium – Hamilton
Western Springs Stadium – Auckland
Westpac Park – Hamilton
Westpac Stadium – Wellington
Wingham Park – Greymouth
Yarrow Stadium – New Plymouth

Niue
Niue High School Oval – Alofi
Village Park (stadium) – Alofi

Norfolk Island
Norfolk Island Central School Oval – Cascade

Northern Mariana Islands
F.M. Palacios Field – Saipan

Palau
National Stadium – Koror

Papua New Guinea
Hubert Murray Stadium – Port Moresby

Samoa
National Soccer Stadium – Tuanaimato

Solomon Islands
Pacific Games Stadium – Honiara

Tokelau
Hemoana Stadium – Nukunonu

Tonga
Mangweni Stadium – Nukualofa

Tuvalu
Tuvalu Sports Ground – Funafuti

Vanuatu
Korman Stadium – Port-Vila
Port Vila Municipal Stadium – Port-Vila

Wallis and Futuna
Stade de Mata-Utu – Mata-Utu

See also
List of stadiums in Africa
List of stadiums in Asia
List of stadiums in Central America and the Caribbean
List of stadiums in Europe
List of stadiums in North America
List of stadiums in South America
List of Oceanian stadiums by capacity

External links
Atlas of worldwide soccer stadiums for GoogleEarth ***NEW***
worldstadiums
Football Stadiums
Football Temples of the World

Lists of buildings and structures in Oceania
Oceania
Oceania sport-related lists